Thumb Tripping is an American 1972 drama film directed by Quentin Masters, written by Don Mitchell, and starring Michael Burns, Meg Foster, Marianna Hill, Burke Byrnes, Michael Conrad and Bruce Dern. It was released in October 1972, by AVCO Embassy Pictures.

Plot
Adventurous hitchhikers decide to accept every ride they are offered and end up with more than they bargained for.

Cast
 Michael Burns as Gary
 Meg Foster as Shay
 Marianna Hill as Lynn
 Burke Byrnes as Jack
 Michael Conrad as "Diesel" 
 Bruce Dern as "Smitty"
 Larry Hankin as "Simp"
 Joyce Van Patten as Mother
 Ed Greenburg as Ed
 Eric Butler as Eric

See also
 List of American films of 1972

References

External links

1972 films
1972 drama films
American drama films
Films produced by Irwin Winkler
Films produced by Robert Chartoff
Embassy Pictures films
1970s English-language films
Films directed by Quentin Masters
1970s American films